Philip Proctor (born 1940) is an American actor, comedian and a member of the Firesign Theatre. He has performed voice-over work for video games, films and television series.

Career 
Of the four members of Firesign Theatre, Proctor has had the greatest amount of mainstream exposure as an actor. A boy soprano in his youth, he worked extensively in musical theatre, including numerous juvenile female roles in productions of Gilbert & Sullivan operettas. In his early adult career, he worked in musical theatre on Broadway, the West Coast and in touring productions. During this period Proctor worked with many famous names, including composer Richard Rodgers, and forged important social connections, becoming close friends with notable figures including Henry Jaglom, Brandon deWilde, Peter Fonda and Karen Black. 

Proctor also appeared occasionally on television in small roles, including episodes of Daniel Boone, All in the Family, and Night Court; and Off-Broadway in the 1964 musical The Amorous Flea. He also provided the voices of Meltdown in Treasure Planet and "Drunk Monkey" in the Dr. Dolittle remake series. He has also provided uncredited ADR overdubs for numerous movies over the years. More recently, he has done voices for several cartoons and video games, including the voice of Howard Deville in Rugrats and All Grown Up! on Nickelodeon, "background" voices for Disney features, and voice work on Power Rangers Time Force. He also did two voices in the GameCube video game Eternal Darkness: Sanity's Requiem. He is the voice of The Professor and White Monkey in the Ape Escape series. Recently, his voice was featured in the video game Dead Rising as Russell Barnaby, in the Assassin's Creed series as Dr. Warren Vidic, and on Adventures in Odyssey as Leonard Meltsner and Detective Don Polehaus. In the 2007 live audio production of the Angie Award-winning screenplay Albatross (original screenplay written by Lance Rucker and Timothy Perrin)  at the International Mystery Writers Festival, he played seven characters requiring four different accents: KGB agent Stefan Linnik, East German Communist Party apparatchik Kurt Mueller; a West Berlin gasthaus owner; an armed forces radio announcer; the Senate minority whip; a Secret Service guard; and Gerhard Derstman, the East German Cultural Attache/Stasi member. He also lent his voice to the game Battlezone. He was the announcer on Big Brother in seasons 3 through 6. Proctor also lent his voice in the Marvel: Ultimate Alliance series as the voices of Edwin Jarvis and Baron Mordo in the first game, and the Tinkerer in the sequel, Marvel: Ultimate Alliance 2. He currently serves among the repertory cast of featured voices in recent and current Disney animated films.

Stage versions of the records Don't Crush That Dwarf, Hand Me the Pliers; The Further Adventures of Nick Danger, Third Eye; and Waiting for the Electrician or Someone Like Him and Temporarily Humboldt County are published Broadway Play Publishing Inc.

In 2017, Proctor published an autobiography entitled Where's My Fortune Cookie? coauthored with Brad Schreiber. 

In recent years Proctor has performed on the radio program American Parlor Songbook in sketches called "Boomers on a Bench".

Filmography

Feature films 
Both animated and live action:

 Murder à la Mod (1968) – Soap Opera (voice)
 The Thousand Plane Raid (1969) – Turret Gunner
 A Safe Place (1971) – Fred
 Tunnel Vision (1976) – Christian A. Broder
 Cracking Up (1977) – Walter Concrete
 J-Men Forever (1979) – J-Man Barton
 Sam's Son (1984) – Art Fisher
 Amazon Women on the Moon (1987) – Mike (segment "Silly Pate")
 Lobster Man from Mars (1989) – Lou
 Night Life (1989) – Randolph Whitlock
 Toy Story (1995) – Pizza Planet Guard / Pizza Planet Announcer (voice)
 Hercules (1997) – Boat captain / Snowball the cat (voice)
 Dr. Dolittle (1998) – Drunk monkey (voice)
 The Rugrats Movie (1998) – Howard Deville / Igor (voice)
 A Bug's Life (1998) – Ant #1 / Fly / Grasshopper (voice)
 Tarzan (1999) – English captain / Scared elephant (voice)
 Toy Story 2 (1999) – Sign-off voice / Airline rep / Mr. Konishi (voice)
 The Independent (2000) – Rob's Dad
 The Adventures of Rocky and Bullwinkle (2000) – RBTV floor director
 Rugrats in Paris: The Movie (2000) – Howard Deville (voice)
 Recess: School's Out (2000) – Golfer #2 / Scientist #2 (voice)
 Dr. Dolittle 2 (2001) – Drunk monkey (voice)
 Spirited Away (2001) – Frog-like chef (English version, voice)
 Monsters, Inc. (2001) – Charlie Proctor (voice)
 Asterix & Obelix: Mission Cleopatra (2002) – Getafix (English version, voice)
 Treasure Planet (2002) – Blinko (voice)
 Rugrats Go Wild (2003) – Howard Deville (voice)
 Brother Bear (2003) – Inuit tribe members (voice)
 Home on the Range (2004) – Man on train (voice)
 The Incredibles (2004) – Guard #1 (voice)
 Thru the Moebius Strip (2005) – Rebel (English version, voice)
 Hollywood Dreams (2006) – Theater director
 Happily N'Ever After (2006) – Amigo 1 (voice)
 Fly Me to the Moon (2007) – Senior official (voice)
 Outback (2012) – Lug (voice)
 The Reef 2: High Tide (2012) – Moe (voice)

Television

Animation 
 Pound Puppies (1987) – Rusty the Plott Hound
 Taz-Mania (1991–1993) – Chief Bushrat
 Rugrats (1991–2004) – Howard Deville / Announcer / Bob / Circus Ringmaster / Clown, Dance Announcer / Policeman / Man / Band Leader / Oarsman / Commander / Germ / French Voice / Car Alarm / Workman / Paul / Paul Gatsby / Mover / Bernie / Allen Murphy / Driver #1 / Tour Guide / DJ / Brinks Guard / Richter / Mr. Loew / Earl / Golfer #2 / Intern / Dr. Lecter / Thorg / Mr. Steele
 The Tick (1994–1996) – Courderoy Cordova / Fortissimo Brothers / Charles' Father
 Spider-Man The Animated Series (1997) – Electro / Rhienholdt Kragov
 The Wild Thornberrys (2000) – Game Host / Body Builder
 Justice League (2002) – First Humanoid
 All Grown Up! (2003–2008) – Howard Deville / Mr. Jacobi / Priest / Italian Shopper / Football Coach / Plastic Soccer Player
 Grim & Evil (2004) – Dr. Cornea / Ogre
 Ben & Izzy (2006) – Mark Twain
 Famous 5: On the Case (2008) – Ralph Campbell

Live action 
 Big Brother (1999) – Announcer (seasons 3–5)
 Power Rangers Time Force (2001) – Miracon (voice)
 Arrested Development (2015) – Rev. Bob Patterson

Video games 

 Bomb Squad (1982) - Frank
 B-17 Bomber (1982) - Pilot
 Lighthouse: The Dark Being (1996) – Dr. Jeremiah Krick
 Battlezone (1998) – General George Collins / Russian tank pilot
 Star Trek: Klingon Academy (2000) – Civil War Helm Officer / Tako / Commander Roq
 Star Wars: Galactic Battlegrounds (2001) – Viceroy Nute Gunray
 La Pucelle: Tactics (2002) – Father Salade (English version)
 Blood Omen II: Legacy of Kain (2002) – Faustus
 Eternal Darkness: Sanity's Requiem (2002) – Roberto Bianchi / Bishop
 Syphon Filter: The Omega Strain (2004) – Proust / ALA B / Pulikovsky / CDP Soldier B / Samaev
 Area 51 (2005) – Mr. White
 007: From Russia with Love (2005) – Q
 Ape Escape: On the Loose (2005) – Professor (US version)
 Ape Escape 3 (2005) – Monkey White / Professor (US version)
 Syphon Filter: Dark Mirror (2006) – Viktor Yavlinsky
 Dead Rising (2006) – Russell Barnaby (English version)
 Marvel: Ultimate Alliance (2006) – Edwin Jarvis / Baron Mordo
 SOCOM II U.S. Navy SEALs (2006) – Arjan Manjani
 Blue Dragon (2006) – Fushira (English version)
 Assassin's Creed (2007) – Warren Vidic
 Marvel: Ultimate Alliance 2 (2009) – Tinkerer / Magneto
 The Saboteur (2009) – Kessler
 The Lord of the Rings: War in the North (2011) – Radagast the Brown
 Darksiders II (2012) – The Lord of Bones
 Batman: Arkham Knight (2015) – Simon Stagg

References

External links 
 Planet Proctor
 
 KCRW "Bob Claster's Funny Stuff" interview about early days of Firesign Theater, and a separate show in which Proctor discusses Bob & Ray

1940 births
Living people
People from Goshen, Indiana
American male voice actors
American male stage actors
American male radio actors
American male video game actors
Male actors from Indiana
The Yale Record alumni
The Firesign Theatre